Singh Is Bliing is a 2015 Indian Hindi-language action comedy film directed by Prabhu Deva and produced by Ashvini Yardi under Grazing Goat Pictures, which provided the story and screenplay. The film stars Akshay Kumar, Amy Jackson, Lara Dutta and Kay Kay Menon. It is a quasi-sequel to the 2008 film Singh Is Kinng.

Singh Is Bliing was released in global cinemas on 2 October 2015, coinciding with Gandhi Jayanti, to mixed reviews from critics. Despite of getting mixed to negative reviews the film became a 'HIT' at the box office by grossing over 135crores worldwide against a budget of 70crores with all praise for Kumar's performance . It was amongst the highest grossers of the year.

Plot 
Raftaar Singh (Akshay Kumar) is a nice and fun-loving but uneducated man, with a mischievous and humorous character. He is thrown out of his home by his father who gives him an ultimatum: if he wants to come back, he must get into business with Kirpal Singh in Goa or marry a woman called Sweetie whom he doesn't like. Raftaar chooses the former. Meanwhile, Sara Rana (Amy Jackson) is shown living in Romania with her father, who made bad choices and works for the mafia. Mark, a mafia boss, wants to marry Sara but is rejected by Sara and her father, and shoots Mr Rana in anger. Sara manages to escape to Goa where she hopes to find her estranged mother.

Raftaar meets Kirpal Singh and lies about speaking English in order to get a job taking care of Sara while she is in India. Raftaar and his friends meet Sara at the airport; finding that Sara does not understand Hindi, Raftaar hires a translator, Emily (Lara Dutta). Sara meets Kirpal and feels safe but presumes Raftaar to be a bad guy. Sara's opinion changes when she sees Raftaar helping a woman who was bothered by a bunch of goons. When these goons later come after Raftaar, they are beaten-up by Sara. Emily is shocked to see that Sara can fight, but Sara warns Emily not to reveal about the incident to Raftaar.

Raftaar's friends and Sara are kidnapped by the same goons; Raftaar tries to save them but gets badly beaten. Sara later fights all the goons away and begins to fall for Raftaar. Kirpal feels happy with Raftaar's performance and soon becomes a successful businessman with his help. Mark learns that Sara is in Goa and sends his men to bring her back. Raftaar and Sara try to flee but their car is hit and Raftaar is beaten-up. He later fights them all except for a woman who is beaten-up by Sara. On Kirpal's advice, Raftaar takes Sara to his family home in Punjab.

Sara meets Raftaar's parents, and seeing Raftaar with them she reminisces of her childhood and cheers-up. Raftaar's father asks Sara about her relationship with Raftaar, and she reveals that she is in love with him. Earlier, Emily had handed responsibility to Raftaar to find Sara's lost mother, and they return to Goa where Sara sees her mother with a child, thinking her mother had a second marriage and is happily living her life. Sara decides to go back to Romania, saying she would never return. Raftaar feels heartbroken seeing her leave.

In Romania, Sara finds her father recovering in hospital. Raftaar finds Sara's mother and brings her to Romania, reuniting the family, and Sara confesses her love to Raftaar. Raftaar decides to marry Sara, telling his family and purchasing a cake, flowers and new clothes. He goes to church but is angered when he finds Sara about to marry Mark. Sara refuses to marry Mark, who challenges Raftaar to a fight. Raftaar manages to beat Mark and his men but is shot. Sara is worried that Raftaar may die, but he wakes after remembering the lessons taught by his father and resumes the fight with Mark. Raftaar is able to beat the mafia and Mark, who dies after saying "You're too good, sardaar " ( 'chieftain' or 'leader'), with Raftaar left hanging by the side of a bridge. Sara and Raftaar confirm their love for each other, and Raftaar is saved and returns to Punjab to celebrate his happiness with his friends, family, and Sara. The film ends with Raftaar and Sara performing a song together.

Cast
 Akshay Kumar as Raftaar Singh
 Amy Jackson as Sara Rana
 Kay Kay Menon as Mark
 Lara Dutta as Emily
 Pradeep Rawat as Kirpal Singh
 Anil Mange as Pompy
 Arfi Lamba as Pappy
 Rati Agnihotri as Harpreet Kaur, Raftaar's mother
 Yograj Singh as Raftaar's father
 Kunal Kapoor as Mr. Rana, Sara's Father
 Ali Haidar as the airline passenger (special appearance)
Prabhu Deva cameos as a man in the washroom and in the song "Singh and Kaur". Also Sunny Leone cameos as a woman who Singh mistakes for Sara in the airport.

Production

Development

In early 2014, it was announced that actor Akshay Kumar and director Prabhudheva would be reuniting for another film after their previous blockbuster, Rowdy Rathore. Soon after, it was confirmed that the film would be titled 'Singh Is Bliing' and was to be produced by Grazing Goat Pictures.
Kumar had also shot some scenes with a lion.

Kumar made it clear that the film was not a sequel to his 2008 film Singh Is Kinng.

Casting
After Akshay Kumar was signed for the lead role, Kareena Kapoor was replaced by Kriti Sanon for the female lead.
After training for the role, Sanon opted out of the film and was replaced by Amy Jackson.

Lara Dutta, who was last seen in the 2013 film David, made a comeback with Singh Is Bling.

It was reported that actor Vivek Oberoi would play the negative role in the film,
but he was replaced by Kay Kay Menon as the main antagonist, Mark.

Actor Kunal Kapoor, who was last in the 1985 film Trikal, was signed to play Sara Rana's father.

Filming

Principal photography started in early April 2015. Kumar posted a photo on Twitter stating the film's first day shoot.
The film started its first day shoot in Patiala.
Portions of the film were reportedly shot in Goa in early May 2015.
The final portion of the film including the climax was reportedly shot in Romania's Hunedoara Castle in the first week of July.

Release

Objections by Sikh clergy

Shri Akal Takht Jathedar (the highest member of the Sikh clergy), Giani Gurbachan Singh, objected to scenes in the film's trailer. He said that equating Holy Golden Temple with whisky and chicken is highly objectionable, as were film posters which had Kada with inscribed Gurbani shown with semi-clad women. It was appealed that Shiromani Gurdwara Parbandhak Committee should be consulted by all film producers before producing movies showing Sikh characters, religious places or religious symbols.

Censorship
Some Sikh organisations raised objections to scenes of the film which contained Kara used as a weapon and the lead character's turban being set on fire. Central Board of Film Certification decided to delete these scenes from the film. Kumar screened the movie for the organisations to ensure nothing that would hurt the Sikh community was shown.

Critical response

Shubha Shetty Saha from Mid-Day described the comedy as "random and silly", but commented that "it is this randomness that also makes it a breezy, entertaining film". Devesh Sharma from Filmfare wrote that filmgoers should "watch the film if you like cornball comedies". Shubhra Gupta from The Indian Express, however, was less receptive to the film, which she rated 1.5 stars of 5, expounding, "The only thing which saves it is that it wears its silliness proudly on its hero's 'pug' (turban)".

Rohit Vats from Hindustan Times noted the film's plot holes, poor screenplay and problematic dialogue. Saibal Chatterjee from NDTV wrote, "What is irretrievably amiss with the film is that nothing it says manages to drift anywhere near some degree of coherence." Surbhi Redkar from Koimoi commented, "Akshay Kumar's Singh Is Bliing is enjoyable in parts but as a whole it is not up to the mark. It loses its bling over time and you are just left watching the silly antics of Mr. Singh."

Tushar Joshi from Daily News and Analysis wrote, "Singh is Bliing has some genuinely funny moments and Lara Dutta brings a certain freshness to the film." India TV wrote, "Overall, Singh is Bliing does not disappoint. One steps in expecting mindless humour, entertainment and some fairly good performances and on that front the film delivers. That there would be a spectacular story was never an expectation".

Bishwajit Aribam from Tehelka said that the film seemed to be a copy of the 2006 South Korean film My Wife is a Gangster 3.

Soundtrack 

The soundtrack album of Singh is Bliing consists of eight songs with an unplugged versions and two remix versions. Sneha Khanwalkar composed only one song titled "Tung Tung Baaje", Sajid–Wajid composed one song titled "Cinema Dekhe Mamma" and Meet Bros also composed one song "Dil Kare Chu Che". Manj Musik composed two tracks "Singh And Kaur", "Mahi Aaja", the remix versions of the two tracks he composed and an unplugged version of the song "Mahi Aaja". Sandeep Shirodkar composed the film score. The lyrics were penned by Sneha Khanwalkar, Manj Musik, Nindy Kaur, Raftaar, Big Dhillon, Wajid, Irfan Kamal and Kumaar. A single from the film "Tung Tung Baaje" was launched digitally on 12 August 2015, and was premiered with another Akshay Kumar-starrer Brothers on 14 August 2015, which is something new for a Bollywood film. The full album was released on 28 August 2015, and received positive reviews from critics. Popular music website Glamsham rated the album 3.5 out of 5 stars and stated that "The album does manage to live up to its expectations" and chose "Tung Tung Baaje", "Singh And Kaur" and "Maahi Aaja" as their picks.

Box office
The film became Kumar's highest-opener, beating the previous record of Brothers as it collected  net on its opening day. On its second day the film collected  net. The film collected  net on its third day, bringing its first weekend total to an estimated . By the end of its first week, the film collected approximately  net.

The film grossed over ₹1.25 billion worldwide by the end of its theatrical run.

Overseas
The film grossed  on first two days of its release overseas.

References

External links
 
 Singh Is Bliing at Bollywood Hungama

2015 films
2010s Hindi-language films
2015 action comedy films
Films directed by Prabhu Deva
Indian action comedy films
Films set in Amritsar
Indian remakes of South Korean films
Films set in Goa
Films set in India
Films set in Punjab, India
Films set in Romania
Films set in South Africa
2015 masala films
Films shot in Punjab, India
Films shot in Romania
Films scored by Sajid–Wajid
Films scored by Meet Bros Anjjan
Films scored by Sneha Khanwalkar
Films scored by Manj Musik
Films about Sikhism
2015 comedy films